Just for Laughs is an annual comedy festival in Montreal.

Just for Laughs may also refer to:

 Just for Laughs Gags, a Canadian silent comedy show since 2000
 Just for Laughs (Australian TV series), a 2007 Australian version of the Canadian show
 Just for Laughs (UK TV series), a 2003–2007 Northern Irish version of the Canadian show
 Just for Laughs (U.S. TV series), a 2007–2008 U.S. version of the Canadian show
 Just for Laughs Gags Asia, a 2010 Singaporean version of the Canadian show
 Just for Laughs Museum, a museum in Montreal